Guidobaldo del Monte (11 January 1545 – 6 January 1607, var. Guidobaldi or Guido Baldi), Marquis del Monte, was an Italian mathematician, philosopher and astronomer of the 16th century.

Biography 
Del Monte was born in Pesaro. His father, Ranieri, was from a leading wealthy family in Urbino. Ranieri was noted for his role as a soldier and also as the author of two books on military architecture. The Duke of Urbino, Duke Guidobaldo II, honoured him with the title Marchese del Monte so the family had only become a noble one in the generation before Guidobaldo. On the death of his father Guidobaldo inherited the title of Marchese.

Guidobaldo studied mathematics at the University of Padua in 1564. While there he became a friend of the great Italian poet Torquato Tasso. In fact Guidobaldo may have known Tasso before they studied at Padua together, for Tasso was almost exactly the same age as Guidobaldo and had been educated at the court of the Duke of Urbino, with the duke's son, from 1556.

Guidobaldo then served as a soldier in the ensuing conflict in Hungary between the Habsburg Empire and the Ottoman Empire. After serving in the army, Guidobaldo returned to his estate of (Monte Baroccio) Mombaroccio in the Marche, where he was able to spend his time doing research into mathematics, mechanics, astronomy and optics. He studied mathematics under Federico Commandino during this period and became one of his most staunch disciples. He also became a friend of Bernardino Baldi, who was also a student of Commandino around the same time.

He corresponded with several mathematicians including Giacomo Contarini, Francesco Barozzi and Galileo Galilei. His invention of a drafting instrument for constructing regular polygons and dividing a line into any number of segments was incorporated as a feature of Galileo's geometric and military compass.

Guidobaldo was also important in helping Galileo Galilei in his academic career. Galileo, then a promising, but unemployed 26-year-old, had written an essay on hydrostatic balance, which struck Guidobaldo as being nothing short of genius. He then commended Galileo to his brother, the Cardinal Del Monte, who referred him to the powerful Duke of Tuscany, Ferdinando I de' Medici. Under his patronage, Galileo got an indication to a professorship of mathematics at the University of Pisa, in 1589. Guidobaldo became a staunch friend of Galileo and helped him again in 1592, when he had to apply to the chair of mathematics at the University of Padua, due to the hatred and machinations of Giovanni de' Medici, a son of Cosimo I de' Medici, against Galileo. Notwithstanding their friendship, Guidobaldo was a critic of Galileo's principle of the isochronicity of the pendulum, a major discovery which Guidobaldo thought was impossible.

Guidobaldo wrote an influential book about perspective, titled Perspectivae Libri VI, published at Pesaro in 1600. Several painters, architects and the theater stage designer Nicola Sabbatini used this geometrical knowledge in their works.

He died at Mombaroccio in 1607.

Works

External links 

 
 

1545 births
1607 deaths
16th-century Italian mathematicians
17th-century Italian mathematicians
17th-century Italian astronomers
Italian philosophers
People from Pesaro
16th-century Italian astronomers